Edward F. Riley Sr. (November 25, 1895 – February 16, 1990) was an American politician in the state of Washington. He served in the Washington House of Representatives from 1939 to 1951 and in the Senate from 1951 to 1965.

References

1990 deaths
1895 births
Democratic Party Washington (state) state senators
Democratic Party members of the Washington House of Representatives
20th-century American politicians